Soviet submarine K-129 may refer to one or both of the following submarines of the Soviet Navy:

 , a  nuclear-powered ballistic missile submarine.

Russian Navy ship names
Soviet Navy ship names